Dinesh a/l Rajasingam (born 13 February 1998) is a Malaysian professional footballer who plays as a left-back for Malaysia Super League club Sabah.

Club career

Sri Pahang
Dinesh signed his professional contract with Sri Pahang in 2016. On 3 August 2016, he made his debut for the club in a 3–0 win over Kedah Darul Aman at Darulaman Stadium.

Selangor
On 15 December 2020, Dinesh completed his transfer to join Selangor after almost 5 years with Sri Pahang.

Career statistics

Club

Honours
Sri Pahang
 Malaysia FA Cup: 2018

References

External links
 

Malaysian footballers
People from Selangor
1995 births
Living people
Sri Pahang FC players
Selangor FA players
Association football defenders
Competitors at the 2019 Southeast Asian Games
Malaysia youth international footballers
Southeast Asian Games competitors for Malaysia